Kory may refer to:

Kory (given name)
Kaye Kory (born 1947), American politician
Pierre Kory, American critical care physician
KORY-CD, television channel in Eugene, Oregon, U.S.

See also
Korey, given name and surname
Korie, given name and surname
Cory (disambiguation)